Kari Chirathe is a 2010 Indian Kannada-language film directed by K Madesh, starring
Duniya Vijay, Sharmila Mandre, Yagna Shetty and Rangayana Raghu in lead roles.

Cast 
 Duniya Vijay as Madha 
 Sharmila Mandre
 Yagna Shetty as Bharti
Rangayana Raghu 
 Imran Khan 
 Raghav Uday 
 Anil Kumar 
 Umesh Punga 
 Jai Jagadish

Music

Reception 
The film received mixed to negative reviews from critics. The Times of India gave the film 3 out of 5 stars. Sify, in their review, wrote- "Kari Chirathe adds to the list of so-called action potboilers which have hit the screens in almost all the languages in the country. The story lacks freshness". Shruti Indira Lakshminarayana of Rediff.com scored the film at 1.5 out of 5 stars and says "Yagna hopes to bring out her oomph factor. She had proved her mettle in Edelu Manjunatha and Sugreeva, but fails to impress this time. Sudha Belavadi, who has time and again come out with good performances, also falters. Kari Chirate could have been an ideal mass entertainer, but fails". Bangalore Mirror wrote "Sharmila is believable as a domicile unglamorous wife, yet delectable, particularly in songs. Rangayana Raghu softens his histrionics but gets the maximum applause from the crowd for his performance. The songs are pleasant to watch and with a commendable cinematography to boot, Kari Chirathe makes for a decent film".

References

External links 
 

2010 films
2010s Kannada-language films